Mohamed Fahmy Hassan was the Chairman of Maldives Civil Service Commission. He is a native of Fuvahmulah, Maldives and is a Master-Degree graduate from the University of Bath, England.

Fahmy started his career in 1975 in the broadcasting industry and since then has worked in offices like the President's Office, Ministry of Health and various schools and offices of the Ministry of Education. Fahmy has taught in or managed a total of 11 educational institutes in the country and has also authored several school text books and scripts for educational television and radio programs. He was also instrumental in coordinating and managing the work required to establish four different schools across the Maldives.

He was the High Commissioner of the Maldives to Malaysia from 2015 to 2016, when the Maldives withdrew from the Commonwealth, then he was the Ambassador of the Maldives to Malaysia from 2016 to 2019.

References

21st-century Maldivian people
Alumni of the University of Bath
Living people
High Commissioners of the Maldives to Malaysia
Year of birth missing (living people)